Sabin Chettri (born 6 July 1994) is an Indian cricketer. He made his Twenty20 debut on 15 November 2019, for Sikkim in the 2019–20 Syed Mushtaq Ali Trophy.

References

External links
 

1994 births
Living people
Indian cricketers
Sikkim cricketers
Place of birth missing (living people)